Pavitt is a surname. Notable people with the surname include:

Bill Pavitt (1920–1989), British footballer
Bruce Pavitt (born 1959), American businessman
James Pavitt (born 1946), American intelligence official
Keith Pavitt (1937–2002), British academic
Laurie Pavitt (1914–1989), British politician
Ron Pavitt (1926–1988), British athlete